William Paulson (born 17 November 1994) is a middle-distance runner who competes for Canada.

Paulson has dual Canadian-British citizenship, thanks to his French-Canadian mother and British father. Paulson was born in the UK and grew up in Tetbury, Gloucestershire and attended Leighterton Primary School and Pate's Grammar School, before going to Princeton for an undergraduate degree in biology. Paulson signed on to a one-year master’s program at Arizona State University in Phoenix. After competing in the NCAA he finished fifth in the indoor mile and fifth in the outdoor 1,500m in 2019. Paulson holds the Arizona State University record for fastest mile, running a time of 3:58.07 indoors in February 2019. Paulson won the Canadian 1,500m title in 2019 and also won a bronze medal at the 2019 Pan American Games. In 2020, he turned professional with the Oregon Track Club.

In 2022, Paulson competed in the 1500m track event at the Commonwealth Games, placing tenth out of twelve.

References

External links
 

Living people
1994 births
Canadian male middle-distance runners
People from Tetbury
English male middle-distance runners
Athletes (track and field) at the 2019 Pan American Games
Pan American Games bronze medalists for Canada
Pan American Games medalists in athletics (track and field)
Pan American Games track and field athletes for Canada
Medalists at the 2019 Pan American Games
20th-century Canadian people
21st-century Canadian people